Midilinae is a subfamily of the lepidopteran family Crambidae. It was described by Eugene G. Munroe in 1958. The 10 genera altogether comprise 57 species, with the majority of them occurring in the Neotropical realm, whereas Dolichobela and Styphlolepis are found in Australia.

Genera
Cacographis Lederer, 1863 (= Zazanisa Walker, 1865)
Dismidila Dyar, 1914
Dolichobela Turner, 1932
Eupastranaia Becker, 1973 (= Pastranaia Munroe, 1970)
Gonothyris Hampson, 1896
Hositea Dyar, 1910
Midila Walker, 1859 (= Singamia Möschler, 1882, Tetraphana Ragonot, 1891)
Odilla Schaus, 1940
Phryganomima Hampson, 1917
Styphlolepis Hampson, 1896

References

 , 2012: Revision of Odilla noralis Schaus and Transfer of Erupini to Midilinae (Lepidoptera: Crambidae). Annals of Carnegie Museum 80 (4): 309–322. Abstract: 
 , 2012: A molecular phylogeny for the pyraloid moths (Lepidoptera: Pyraloidea) and its implications for higher-level classification. Systematic Entomology 37 (4): 635–656. Abstract: .

 
Crambidae
Taxa named by Eugene G. Munroe
Moth subfamilies